The Reyssouze is a river in the Ain department in eastern France. It is a left tributary of the Saône, which it joins near Pont-de-Vaux. Its source is in Journans, in the Bresse region. The Reyssouze flows generally northwest through the following communes: Montagnat, Bourg-en-Bresse, Attignat, Montrevel-en-Bresse and Pont-de-Vaux.

References

Rivers of France
Rivers of Auvergne-Rhône-Alpes
Rivers of Ain